Victor Manuel Ochoa Ventura (born 1917 in El Salvador). is a Salvadoran football player and former coach.

Club career 
Nicknamed Pipe, Ochoa was the first goalscorer for FAS in the club's history in 1947.

International career 
Ochoa made his debut for the El Salvador national team in unofficial friendly against Costa Rican side Liga Deportiva Alajuelense in 1940 where he came on as sub, his team went on to lose 1-0.

Managerial career
Ochoa also was the first technical director of FAS. As a coach "Pipe" Ochoa has obtained four championships at national level  (2 National Championships with FAS, 2 National Championships with Águila), he was record holder before Conrado Miranda won his fifth league title in 1977.
He also coached in Honduras first division with Honduras Progreso

Achievements

References

External links
Equipo Titular 1969 - CD FAS 

Possibly living people
Salvadoran footballers
Salvadoran football managers
C.D. Águila managers
C.D. FAS footballers
C.D. FAS managers
Association football midfielders